The  is a mountain range on the Bōsō Peninsula of Chiba Prefecture, Japan. The hill range runs from roughly in a line from Mobara or Ōamishirasato to Kisarazu, but is not formally defined. It is an important part of the Minami Bōsō Quasi-National Park.

Geography 

The Bōsō Hill Range is still extensively wooded. The area from the Yōrō Ravine to Mount Seichō is noted for its forests of live oak. The hill range also has noted forests of oaks, chestnut, Japanese cedar (Cryptomeria), and various species of evergreen. The hill area around Tateyama is noted for its forests of castanopsis trees, a genus of evergreens belonging to the beech family.

History

Premodern history 

The Bōsō Hill Range was settled from the earliest periods of Japanese history. The Yōrō Ravine in present-day Ōtaki, Chiba is home to Jōmon period remains. Kofun tumuli were built across the entire hill range in the Kofun period, but Futtsu and Ichihara have especially rich examples of tumuli. Under the Taika Reform of 645, during the Asuka period, the hill range became part of three provinces, Shimōsa Province to the north, Kazusa Province in the middle part of the range, and Awa Province to the south. The hill range is noted for its richness of castles built during the Sengoku period as part of medieval conflicts.

Modern history 

The provinces endured until Chiba Prefecture was established at the end of the 19th century in the Meiji period. The Bōsō Hill Range provided a natural fortification against air attack of Tokyo during World War II, when the 252 Air Group of the Imperial Japanese Navy (IJN) built the Mobara Air Field in 1941 in Mobara. After the war land reform was carried out in the region. The eastern part of the hill range saw major economic development as part of the greater Metropolitan Tokyo region.

Economy 

The hill range was known for charcoal production in the past. The hill range is still home to many dairy farms. Numerous golf courses were developed in the hill region, and recreational facilities continue to be developed in the area. The hill range is popular as a hiking destination.

Important mountains

References 

Mountain ranges of Chiba Prefecture